The Chincoteague Fire Department is a historic U.S. building located at 4026/4028 Main Street, Chincoteague Island, Virginia.   This building was initially constructed in 1930 and expanded in 2019

The Chincoteague Volunteer Fire Company operates from this building with approximately 25 active and 85 life members with (4) pumper engines, (1) 75 foot ladder, (1) rescue truck and (2) advanced life saving ambulances.  The Chincoteague Volunteer Fire Department owns the herd of Chincoteague Ponies on Assateague Island and holds the annual Pony Penning to help raise money for the department.

References

External links
Chincoteague Volunteer Fire Company

Buildings and structures in Accomack County, Virginia
Chincoteague, Virginia
Fire departments in Virginia